The Cairnwell is a mountain in the Eastern Highlands of Scotland, south of Braemar. It is often considered to be one of the most spoiled of the Munros, due to the Glenshee Ski Centre which covers the eastern slope of the mountain. 

The Cairnwell is usually climbed from the Glen Shee ski centre, which is at a height of 650 m, making this probably the easiest Munro to climb. It is often climbed with Carn Aosda.

References

Munros
Mountains and hills of the Eastern Highlands
Mountains and hills of Aberdeenshire
Mountains and hills of Perth and Kinross